Elections to Wolverhampton City Council were held on 1 May 2008 in Wolverhampton, England. One third of the council was up for election and the Labour group lost overall control after losing eight seats across the City.

Turnout across the City was 34.6%, with variations in turnout ranging from 22.1% in the Bushbury South & Low Hill ward up to 45.4% in Tettenhall Wightwick.

Following the election, an alliance between the Conservative and Liberal Democrat groups was formed, ending 14 years of Labour Party rule.

Composition

Due to the only Liberal Councillor officially joining the Liberal Democrats, the Liberal Democrats had increased their number of Councillors in 2007 from 3 to 4.

Prior to the election, the composition of the council was:

Labour Party 36
Conservative Party 19
Liberal Democrat 4
Independent 1

Following the election, the composition of the council is:

Labour Party 28
Conservative Party 27
Liberal Democrat 5

Election result

Ward results

2008
2000s in the West Midlands (county)
2008 English local elections